Willis James Streater III (December 17, 1957 – February 20, 2004) was a Canadian football quarterback in the Canadian Football League (CFL). He played for the Toronto Argonauts. Streater played college football at Tennessee.

References

1957 births
2004 deaths
Players of American football from North Carolina
American players of Canadian football
American football quarterbacks
Canadian football quarterbacks
Tennessee Volunteers football players
Toronto Argonauts players
People from Sylva, North Carolina